The Templar House in Toledo, in Castile-La Mancha, Spain, was built and decorated between the years 1085 and 1114, belonging to this period the general structure, typically Al-Andalusian, supported by the vaults of the basement and organized around the courtyard. The strict contemporaneousness existing between this monument of Toledo, the Aljafería palace of Zaragoza (1046–1082), and the roofing of the church of San Millán of Segovia (cut and put on around 1110) is shown by the fact that the large majority of the construction elements for the roofs and ornamental designs are practically the same on all three buildings.

Various sources agree that the property was once owned by the Knights Templar, and it is said that it was used as a guest house in the 14th century.

Description 
The most primitive elements of the whole are the remains of the hall of Caliphal time (10th century), located in the subsoil or basement, under the hall of the eastern wing. This hall has stucco walls and bicromo ornamentation, of Mozarabic reminiscent. It corresponds to an earlier state of the building, in which it would constitute the hall of the western wing of another courtyard located to its eastern side.

The ground floor is distributed around the courtyard. From the 11th–12th century the hall, the alcove and the upper chamber of the western wing are conserved, with its corresponding alfarje. It highlights the transformation of the arch of access, that leave of being an arch of gemade of horseshoe taifa to have a Mudéjar yeseria, decorated with vegetal motives.

In the hall of the southern wing, the most important modification consists of the suppression of the lower part of the facade, to realize in yeseria gable door, flanked by two lion protome and framed by double-arched stone, of horseshoe slightly pointed, which has two medallions with Castilian emblems. The whole ensemble is framed by a rectangular ornament (arrabá) with kufic legend inscribed, datable at the end of the 12th century or the beginning of the 13th century.

In front, occupying the space that originally belonged to another room, we find the raised porch, with a terrace on the deck, made up of two factory masons (originally also covered with yeseria); They support a complex framework of carpentry, which imitates a thick beam, in which the suras III and XLVIII of the Quran are partially carved.

References

Bien de Interés Cultural landmarks in the Province of Toledo
Buildings and structures completed in 1114
Buildings and structures in Toledo, Spain
Houses in Spain
Knights Templar